From List of National Natural Landmarks, these are the National Natural Landmarks in Oklahoma.  There are 3 in total.

References

Oklahoma
National Natural Landmarks